Olds/North 40 Ranch Aerodrome  was located  north of Olds, Alberta, Canada.

See also
Olds-Didsbury Airport
Olds (Netook) Airport

References

Defunct airports in Alberta
Mountain View County